The Vegan Museum (formerly the National Vegetarian Museum) is a nonprofit travelling exhibition about veganism and vegetarianism. The exhibition tours different locations in and around Chicago. The Vegan Museum documents the history of the vegan and vegetarian movement in the United States.

History 
The museum was founded in 2017 as the National Vegetarian Museum and showed its first exhibition the same year. The museum was founded by Kay Stepkin, a former vegetarian restaurant owner who wrote a column about vegan food called "The Veggie Cook" for the Chicago Tribune from 2011 to 2015.

In 2020, the museum's board changed its name to The Vegan Museum. That same year the museum added an advisory council of influential vegans who include Neal Barnard, MD, president and founder of the Physicians Committee for Responsible Medicine, Anne Dinshah, vice president of the American Vegan Society, and Seth Tibbott, founder of Tofurky.

Collection 
The Vegan Museum documents the history of the vegan and vegetarian movement in the United States. The current exhibit is called "What Does It Mean to Be Vegetarian?” The exhibit consists of 12 seven-by-three-foot panels. The exhibition covers factory farms, Pythagoras, Leonardo Da Vinci, comedian Dick Gregory, the history of the Chicago Vegetarian Society, the Pure Food Lunch Room (Chicago’s first vegetarian restaurant, established in 1900), and the Vegetarian Times, magazine.

Stepkin has amassed a collection of vegan and vegetarian memorabilia, cookbooks, leaflets, and newsletters in her Lincoln Park apartment in Chicago.

See also 
 History of vegetarianism
 Veganism §History

References 

Chicago metropolitan area
Vegan organizations
Veganism in the United States
History museums in Illinois